Seticosta albicentra is a species of moth of the family Tortricidae. It is found in Morona-Santiago Province, Ecuador.

The wingspan is 25 mm for females and 22 mm for males. The ground colour of the forewings is silver white preserved as a postbasal fascia and elements of the posterior third of the wing, where pale brownish and grey markings occur. The hindwings are cream slightly mixed with brownish and strigulated (finely streaked) with brownish.

Etymology
The species name refers to the presence of a white dot at the end of median the cell on the forewings and is derived from Latin albus (meaning white) and centrum (meaning center).

References

Moths described in 2009
Seticosta